The Eichler Network is an American company that produces the quarterly CA-Modern print magazine, a website, and weekly email news articles about mid-century modern (MCM) architecture and design in California. It also publishes a directory of contractors and other service providers who focus on modern home preservation and improvement. Both the Eichler Network and CA-Modern were founded by Marty Arbunich, first as the quarterly Eichler Network print newsletter in 1993, then as the 36-page, full-color magazine since 2006.

Central to the Eichler Network's mission is the preservation of Eichler homes and other mid-century modern homes, which are notable and highly valued as representative of modern design principles promoted by the architect Frank Lloyd Wright and others. The Eichler Network has been recognized for its work in preserving the unique character of mid-century modern homes, having been featured in the New York Times and in Preservation, The Magazine for the National Trust for Historic Preservation. The Eichler Network has also partnered with the Los Angeles Conservancy in its mission to preserve Southern California's mid-century modern legacy.

In 2012, the Eichler Network and its magazine CA-Modern became part of the national conversation surrounding the life of Apple innovator Steve Jobs, who as a child lived in a mid-century modern home.

The Eichler Network mails its magazine free to property addresses of owners of Eichler homes in Northern California and Streng homes in the Sacramento area. Eichler homes are primarily in Northern California but there are approximately 600 in Southern California (and three in upstate New York). The Eichler Network earns revenue by selling advertising to contractors, real estate agents and other firms that focus on mid-century modern homes. All contractors are vetted by the Eichler Network.

The Eichler Network’s website provides an archive with original content and hundreds of articles from the magazine, including pieces on home improvement, profiles of modern designers and artists, and nostalgic features on music and arts, with a focus on the mid-century. The site includes homes for sale, service providers, a readers forum (Chatterbox Lounge) on such topics as home maintenance and a rec room for reader recommendations on companies and products. 

Over the years the Eichler Network has increased its focus on the aesthetics and historical value of Eichler and other mid-century modern homes. It "counsels a new generation on taking care of quirky, aging Modernist houses," according to the New York Times. The Eichler Network held a conference on the subject in 2002, and Marty Arbunich co-authored the 2002 book, Eichler: Modernism Rebuilds the American Dream, with architect Paul Adamson. The Eichler Network, in conjunction with the Historic Quest committee, also spearheaded the successful effort to place the first two Eichler neighborhoods in the Bay Area on the National Register for Historic Places in 2005.

See also
 CA-Modern

References

External links 
 

Magazine publishing companies of the United States
Architecture in the San Francisco Bay Area
Companies based in San Francisco
Publishing companies based in the San Francisco Bay Area